BookmarkSync was an automatic synchronization service that allowed users to access their bookmarks or favorites from any computer or web browser. The BookmarkSync client ran as a small program within the computer's system tray and it monitored the bookmarks in the user's browser, automatically uploading any changes to a central server. This allowed one to keep browsers across separate synchronized computers. Cross-platform synchronization is possible by using the Mac OS X client. BookmarkSync was discontinued around 2006.

History
SyncIT.com Inc. was founded by Michael Berneis and Terence Way in November 1998 and the website went live in March 1999.  At its peak, SyncIT.com grew to a community of over 350,000 users synchronizing their bookmarks and favorites using BookmarkSync product. After a server failure in September 2003, the entire project was open-sourced.  The rights for SyncIT.com were taken over by Jack Dean, who ran Sync2It.com and BookmarkSync.com.  He had developed a new client for the latest browsers including Firefox and Mac platform, and continues to work on this service.

Features
The BookmarkSync client software enables social bookmarking and bookmark data clustering.  The user data input requirements of web-based systems incorporate tagging to build a folksonomy, are eliminated by the automated BookmarkSync client software. Sync2It.com has added bookmark clustering and user bookmark ratios to their search results.

Recent enhancements to the BookmarkSync client software include support for Unicode, fast search and locate, local backup and restore functions, local site validation, social bookmark browsing and multiple language support (German, French, Danish, Dutch, Czech and Spanish).

The BookmarkSync service is free.

See also
Comparison of browser synchronizers

References

External links
 

Social bookmarking